Southern Line may refer to:

 Southern Line (Auckland), a suburban railway line in New Zealand
 Southern Line (Cape Town), a suburban railway line in South Africa
 Southern Line (Thailand), a railway line
 Southern Line (İZBAN), a commuter railway line in İzmir, Turkey